The United Nations Educational, Scientific and Cultural Organization (UNESCO) World Heritage Sites are places of importance to cultural or natural heritage as described in the UNESCO World Heritage Convention, established in 1972. Mexico accepted the convention on 23 February 1984, making its historical sites eligible for inclusion on the list. As of 2018, there are thirty-five World Heritage Sites in Mexico, including twenty-seven cultural sites, six natural sites and two mixed sites. The country ranks first in the Americas and seventh worldwide by number of Heritage sites.

Mexico's first six sites, Sian Ka'an, Pre-Hispanic City and National Park of Palenque, Historic Centre of Mexico City and Xochimilco, Pre-Hispanic City of Teotihuacan, Historic Centre of Oaxaca and Archaeological site of Monte Albán, and Historic Centre of Puebla, were inscribed on the list at the 11th Session of the World Heritage Committee, held at UNESCO headquarters in Paris, France in 1987.

In addition to its inscribed sites, Mexico also maintains twenty-one properties on its tentative list, considered for future nomination.

There are also 9 traditions and celebrations which considered Intangible Cultural Heritage of Mexico: Indigenous festivals dedicated to the dead, the ceremony of the Flying Dancers, the Peña de Bernal, the traditional January party of Chiapa de Corzo, the traditional song of the Purépechas, traditional Mexican cuisine, the Mariachi, the charrería and the pilgrimage of Zapopan.

World Heritage Sites

Site; named after the World Heritage Committee's official designation
Location; at city, regional, or provincial level and geocoordinates
Criteria; as defined by the World Heritage Committee
Area; in hectares and acres. If available, the size of the buffer zone has been noted as well. A lack of value implies that no data has been published by UNESCO
Year; during which the site was inscribed to the World Heritage List
Description; brief information about the site, including reasons for qualifying as an endangered site, if applicable

Location of sites

Numbered sites: 1. Centro Histórico de la Ciudad de México; 2. Ciudad Universitaria; 3. Xochicalco; 4. Monasteries on the slopes of Popocatépetl; 5. Luis Barragan House and Studio; 6. Teotihuacan; 7. Monarch Butterfly Biosphere Reserve; 8. Aqueduct of Padre Tembleque

Legend:  World Cultural Heritage Site;  World Natural Heritage Site;  World Cultural and Natural Heritage Site (Mixed)

Note: The Camino Real de Tierra Adentro inscribed property encompasses 59 cities, towns, bridges, haciendas and other monuments along some 1,400 km of the route. The point shown on the map is an approximate midpoint between historic Mexico City, the southernmost site, and the town of Valle de Allende, the most northern site. For a description and location of each site, see the UNESCO entry.

Sites by state
Exclusive sites refer to sites located in a single state, while shared sites refers to sites with entries in multiple states.

Tentative list
In addition to sites inscribed on the World Heritage list, member states can maintain a list of tentative sites that they may consider for nomination. Nominations for the World Heritage list are only accepted if the site was previously listed on the tentative list. As of 2017, Mexico maintains twenty-one properties on its tentative list:

 Chapultepec Woods, Hill and Castle (2001)
 Historic Town of Alamos (2001)
 Church of Santa Prisca and its Surroundings (2001)
 Pre-Hispanic City of Cantona (2001)
 Great City of Chicomostoc-La Quemada (2001)
 Historic Town of San Sebastián del Oeste (2001)
 Diego Rivera and Frida Kahlo's Home-Study Museum (2001)
 Valle de los Cirios (2004)
 Flora and Fauna Protection Area of Cuatro Ciénegas (2004)
 Historical Town The Royal of the Eleven Thousand Virgins of Cosala in Sinaloa (2004)
 Huichol Route through the sacred sites to Wirikuta (Tatehuari Huajuye) (2004)
 Lacan-Tún – Usumacinta Region (2004)
 Banco Chinchorro Biosphere Reserve (2004)
 Tecoaque (2004)
 Cuetzalan and its Historical, Cultural and Natural Surrounding (2006)
 Historical city of Izamal (Izamal, Mayan continuity in an Historical City) (2008)
 Los Petenes-Ría Celestún (2008)
 Las Pozas, Xilitla (2008)
 Arch of Time of La Venta River (2010)
 Ring of cenotes of Chicxulub Crater, Yucatan (2012)
 Las Labradas, Sinaloa archaeological site (2012)

Pending transboundary nominations

In 2014, the idea to nominate the Manila-Acapulco Galleon Trade Route was initiated by the Mexican ambassador to UNESCO with the Filipino ambassador to UNESCO.

An Experts' Roundtable Meeting was held at the University of Santo Tomas (UST) on April 23, 2015 as part of the preparation of the Philippines for the possible transnational nomination of the Manila-Acapulco Galleon Trade Route to the World Heritage List. The nomination will be made jointly with Mexico.

The following are the experts and the topics they discussed during the roundtable meeting: Dr. Celestina Boncan on the Tornaviaje; Dr. Mary Jane A. Bolunia on Shipyards in the Bicol Region; Mr. Sheldon Clyde Jago-on, Bobby Orillaneda, and Ligaya Lacsina on Underwater Archaeology; Dr. Leovino Garcia on Maps and Cartography; Fr. Rene Javellana, S.J. on Fortifications in the Philippines; Felice Sta. Maria on Food; Dr. Fernando Zialcita on Textile; and Regalado Trota Jose on Historical Dimension. The papers presented and discussed during the roundtable meeting will be synthesized into a working document to establish the route's Outstanding Universal Value.

The Mexican side reiterated that they will also follow suit with the preparations for the route's nomination.

Spain has also backed the nomination of the route in the World Heritage List and has also suggested the archives related to the route under the possession of the Philippines, Mexico, and Spain to be nominated as part of another UNESCO list, the Memory of the World Register.

In 2017, the Philippines established the Manila-Acapulco Galleon Museum in Metro Manila.

References

 
Mexico
World Heritage
World Heritage
World Heritage Sites